Robert Henri Léon Blanc (18 May 1944 – 17 May 1992) was a French professional footballer who played as forward. He was the top scorer of the 1969–70 Division 2 and of the Group Centre of the 1970–71 Division 2.

Honours 
Bastia

 Division 2: 1967–68

Individual

 Division 2 top scorer: 1969–70
 Division 2 Group Centre top scorer: 1970–71

References 

1944 births
1992 deaths
Sportspeople from Var (department)
French footballers
Association football forwards

SC Toulon players
Angoulême Charente FC players
US Boulogne players
Olympique Lyonnais players
SC Bastia players
AS Nancy Lorraine players
Limoges FC players
Stade Poitevin FC players
FC Mantois 78 players
USM Malakoff (football) players
Ligue 2 players
Ligue 1 players
Footballers from Provence-Alpes-Côte d'Azur